Liberty Leading the People is a painting by Eugène Delacroix commemorating the July Revolution of 1830, which toppled King Charles X. A woman of the people with a Phrygian cap personifying the concept of Liberty leads a varied group of people forward over a barricade and the bodies of the fallen, holding the flag of the French Revolution – the tricolour, which again became France's national flag after these events – in one hand and brandishing a bayonetted musket with the other. The figure of Liberty is also viewed as a symbol of France and the French Republic known as Marianne. The painting is sometimes wrongly thought to depict the French Revolution of 1789.

Liberty Leading the People is exhibited in the Louvre in Paris.

History
By the time Delacroix painted Liberty Leading the People, he was already the acknowledged leader of the Romantic school in French painting. Delacroix, who was born as the Age of Enlightenment was giving way to the ideas and style of romanticism, rejected the emphasis on precise drawing that characterised the academic art of his time, and instead gave a new prominence to freely brushed colour.

Delacroix painted his work in the autumn of 1830. In a letter to his brother dated 21 October, he wrote: "My bad mood is vanishing thanks to hard work. I've embarked on a modern subject—a barricade. And if I haven't fought for my country at least I'll paint for her." The painting was first exhibited at the official Salon of 1831.

Symbolism
Delacroix depicted Liberty as both an allegorical goddess-figure and a robust woman of the people. The mound of corpses and wreckage acts as a kind of pedestal from which Liberty strides, barefoot and bare-breasted, out of the canvas and into the space of the viewer. According to Marcus Rediker she might have been inspired by a Dutch portrait of a fighting Anne Bonny. The Phrygian cap she wears had come to symbolize liberty during the first French Revolution, of 1789. The painting has been seen as a marker to the end of the Age of Enlightenment, as many scholars see the end of the French Revolution as the start of the Romantic era.

The fighters are from a mixture of social classes, ranging from the bourgeoisie represented by the young man in a top hat, a student from the prestigious École Polytechnique wearing the traditional bicorne, to the revolutionary urban worker, as exemplified by the boy holding pistols. What they have in common is the fierceness and determination in their eyes. Aside from the flag held by Liberty, a second, minute tricolore can be discerned in the distance flying from the towers of Notre-Dame.

The identity of the man in the top hat has been widely debated. The suggestion that it was a self-portrait by Delacroix has been discounted by modern art historians. In the late 19th century, it was suggested the model was the theatre director Étienne Arago; others have suggested the future curator of the Louvre, Frédéric Villot; but there is no firm consensus on this point.

Several of the figures are probably borrowed from a print by popular artist Nicolas Charlet, a prolific illustrator who Delacroix believed captured, more than anyone else, the peculiar energy of the Parisians.

Purchase and exhibition
The French government bought the painting in 1831 for 3,000 francs with the intention of displaying it in the throne room of the Palais du Luxembourg as a reminder to the "citizen-king" Louis-Philippe of the July Revolution, through which he had come to power. This plan did not come to fruition and the canvas hung in the palace's museum gallery for a few months, before being removed due to its inflammatory political message. After the June Rebellion of 1832, it was returned to the artist. According to Albert Boime,

Champfleury wrote in August 1848 that it had been "hidden in an attic for being too revolutionary." Although Louis-Philippe's Ministry of the Interior initially acquired it as a gesture to the Left, after the uprising at the funeral of Lamarque in June 1832 it was never again openly displayed for fear of setting a bad example. Delacroix was permitted to send the painting to his aunt Félicité for safekeeping. After the Second Republic was established following the revolution of 1848 it was exhibited briefly in that year, and then during the Second Empire in the Salon of 1855. The recently established Third Republic finally acquired the painting in 1874 for the collection of the Musée du Louvre in Paris.

In 1974–75, the painting was the featured work in an exhibition organized by the French government, the Metropolitan Museum of Art in New York and the Detroit Institute of Arts as a Bicentennial gift to the people of the United States. The exhibition, entitled French Painting 1774–1830: The Age of Revolution, marked a rare display of the Delacroix painting, and many of the other 148 works, outside France.  The exhibition was first shown at the Grand Palais from 16 November 1974 to 3 February 1975. It moved to Detroit from 5 March to 4 May 1975, then New York from 12 June to 7 September 1975.

In 1999, it was flown on board an Airbus Beluga from Paris to Tokyo via Bahrain and Calcutta in about 20 hours. It was transported in the vertical position inside a special pressurised container provided with isothermal protection and an anti-vibration device.

In 2012, it was moved to the new Louvre-Lens museum in Lens, Pas-de-Calais, as the starring work in the first tranche of paintings from the Louvre's collection to be installed. On 7 February 2013, the painting was vandalized by a visitor in Lens. An unidentified 28-year-old woman allegedly wrote an inscription ("AE911") on the painting. The woman was immediately arrested by a security guard and a visitor. A short time after the incident, the management of the Louvre and its Pas-de-Calais branch published a press release indicating that "at first glance, the inscription is superficial and should be easily removed". Louvre officials announced the next day that the writing had been removed in less than two hours by a restorer without damaging the original paint, and the piece returned to display that morning.

Legacy

Although Delacroix was not the first artist to depict Liberty in a Phrygian cap, his painting may be the best known early version of the figure commonly known as Marianne, a symbol of the French Republic and of France in general.

The painting may have influenced Victor Hugo's 1862 novel Les Misérables. In particular, the character of Gavroche is widely believed to have been inspired by the figure of the pistols-wielding boy running over the barricade. The novel describes the events of the June Rebellion two years after the revolution celebrated in the painting, the same rebellion that led to its being removed from public view.

The painting inspired Frédéric Auguste Bartholdi's Liberty Enlightening the World, known as the Statue of Liberty in New York City, which was given to the United States as a gift from the French a half-century after Liberty Leading the People was painted. The statue, which holds a torch in its hand, takes a more stable, immovable stance than that of the woman in the painting. An engraved version of part of the painting, along with a depiction of Delacroix, was featured on the 100 franc note from 1978 to 1995.

The painting has had an influence on classical music. George Antheil titled his Symphony No. 6 After Delacroix, and stated that the work was inspired by Liberty Leading the People.  The imagery was adapted by Robert Ballagh to commemorate Ireland's independence struggle on an Irish postage stamp in 1979, the centenary of the birth of Pádraig Pearse, and the painting was used for the band Coldplay's 2008 album cover Viva la Vida or Death and All His Friends, with the words Viva La Vida written in white.  Rigoberta Bandini references the painting in the chorus of her 2021 song Ay mamá. The cover of the 2010 book Enough is Enough: How to Build a New Republic by Fintan O'Toole references the painting, but with Kathleen Ni Houlihan holding the Irish tricolour in Dublin while the leaders of the three main political parties at the time (Brian Cowen, Enda Kenny and Eamon Gilmore) lie on the ground.

During the 20 October 2011 episode of the BBC Radio 4 series In Our Time, host Melvyn Bragg led a panel discussion of the painting.

Liberty Leading the People made an appearance in the 11th episode ("EDGELORD - Revolution of the 14-Year-Olds") of the Netflix animation series Ghost in the Shell: SAC 2045.

The painting was featured in Vincenzo, a 2021 South Korean TV series starring Song Joong-ki in episode 7. The series is also available on Netflix.

Criticism
Liberty Leading the People is considered a republican and anti-monarchist symbol, and as such was sometimes criticized by royalists and monarchists.

See also
 Liberté, égalité, fraternité
 Liberty (goddess)
 Marianne

Notes and references

Bibliography
 
 
 Pastore, Stephen R. (2012) Zola and Delacroix: Genius Amidst the Turmoil. London: Oxford University Press.

External links

 
 Louvre
 Podcast of BBC Radio 4's In Our Time on Delacroix's Liberty Leading the People
 Eugène Delacroix (1798–1863): Paintings, Drawings, and Prints from North American Collections. Full text exhibition catalog from The Metropolitan Museum of Art, which discusses the painting.
 Romanticism in France Delacroix's Liberty Leading the People From smarthistory.
 ArtSleuth: Liberty Leading the People, accidental icon ? Video analysis.

1830 paintings
Paintings in the Louvre by French artists
Paintings by Eugène Delacroix
War paintings
Liberty symbols
Vandalized works of art
19th-century allegorical paintings
Allegorical paintings by French artists
Flags in art
Notre-Dame de Paris